Painesville is a city in and the county seat of Lake County, Ohio, United States, located along the Grand River  northeast of Cleveland. Its population was 19,563 at the 2010 census.

Painesville is the home of Lake Erie College, Morley Library, and the  Historic Downtown Painesville Recreation Area.

History 
Painesville was settled shortly after the Revolutionary War. It was still considered part of the Connecticut Western Reserve. General Edward Paine (1746–1841), a native of Bolton, Connecticut, who had served as a captain in the Connecticut militia during the war, and John Walworth arrived in 1800 with a party of sixty-six settlers, among the first in the Western Reserve.  General Paine later represented the region in the territorial legislature of the Northwest Territory.

In 1800 the Western Reserve became Trumbull County and at the first Court of Quarter Sessions, the county was divided into eight townships.  The smallest of these townships was named Painesville, for General Paine, and encompassed what later became the townships of Perry, Leroy, Hambden, Concord, Chardon, Mentor, and Kirtland.  The township government was organized in 1802.  The post office in Painesville was opened in 1803 with John Walworth as postmaster.

In what was to become the commercial center of the township was a settlement called Oak Openings, its name being descriptive of the scrub oaks and sandy soil.  It was here in 1805 that Gen. Henry Champion laid out a village plat and called it Champion, a name that it carried only until incorporation in 1832, when the name "Painesville" was chosen in honor of General Paine. Two of his descendants, Eleazer A. Paine and Halbert E. Paine, later served as Union Army generals during the American Civil War.

In 1840 Lake County was created from portions of Geauga and Cuyahoga Counties, and Painesville was made the county seat and a courthouse erected.  In 1852, the community of Painesville became a village, and in 1902 the village attained city status.

Geography 
Painesville is located at  (41.722793, -81.249597).

Painesville and Concord townships, along with the village of Fairport Harbor and the city of Mentor, are adjacent to Painesville.

Climate 
Painesville has a hybrid between a humid subtropical and humid continental climate (Köppen Cfa/Dfa). In spite of the mild winter days, lake-effect snow usually brings a lot of accumulation in winter. Summers have warm days and quite muggy nights. Precipitation is high year-round.

Demographics 

Painesville's Hispanic population increased elevenfold between 1990 and 2010. New residents were primarily immigrants from León, Guanajuato, the ninth-largest metropolitan region in Mexico. They had settled in Painesville after finding work in its plant nurseries.

2020 census 

As of the 2020 census, Painesville led the state of Ohio in the percentage of people speaking Spanish at home, comprising 20.2% of the population.

2010 census 
As of the census of 2010, there were 19,563 people, 7,095 households, and 4,381 families living in the city. The racial makeup of the city was 68.2% White, 13.1% African American, 0.3% Native American, 0.8% Asian, 13.2% from other races, and 4.5% from two or more races. Hispanic or Latino of any race were 22.0% of the population.

There were 7,095 households, of which 37.2% had children under the age of 18 living with them, 37.8% were married couples living together, 18.4% had a female householder with no husband present, 5.5% had a male householder with no wife present, and 38.3% were non-families. 29.9% of all households were made up of individuals, and 8.2% had someone living alone who was 65 years of age or older. The average household size was 2.64 and the average family size was 3.33.

The median age in the city was 30.2 years. 28.3% of residents were under the age of 18; 12.6% were between the ages of 18 and 24; 29.9% were from 25 to 44; 20.5% were from 45 to 64; and 8.7% were 65 years of age or older. The gender makeup of the city was 50.3% male and 49.7% female.

2000 census 
As of the census of 2000, there were 17,503 people, 6,525 households, and 4,032 families living in the city. The population density was 2,928.6 people per square mile (1,130.1/km). There were 6,933 housing units at an average density of 1,160.0 per square mile (447.6/km). The racial makeup of the city was 76.99% White, 12.93% African American, 0.29% Native American, 0.42% Asian, 0.01% Pacific Islander, 6.50% from other races, and 2.86% from two or more races. Hispanic or Latino of any race were 12.89% of the population. 15.2% were of German, 9.7% Irish, 9.4% Italian, 8.3% English and 5.5% American ancestry according to Census 2000. 85.6% spoke English and 13.2% Spanish as their first language.

There were 6,525 households, out of which 34.4% had children under the age of 18 living with them, 40.4% were married couples living together, 16.6% had a female householder with no husband present, and 38.2% were non-families. 31.2% of all households were made up of individuals, and 9.6% had someone living alone who was 65 years of age or older. The average household size was 2.55 and the average family size was 3.22.

In the city, the population was spread out, with 27.7% under the age of 18, 12.1% from 18 to 24, 32.5% from 25 to 44, 17.4% from 45 to 64, and 10.2% who were 65 years of age or older. The median age was 30 years. For every 100 females, there were 97.0 males. For every 100 females age 18 and over, there were 93.7 males.

The median income for a household in the city was $34,842, and the median income for a family was $41,000. Males had a median income of $31,082 versus $23,346 for females. The per capita income for the city was $15,391. About 13.4% of families and 16.0% of the population were below the poverty line, including 22.6% of those under age 18 and 10.4% of those age 65 or over.

Schools 
Public education in the city of Painesville is provided by the Painesville City Schools.

Hershey Montessori School is Painesville's independent school option that educates students from birth through sixth grade. Its seventh through twelfth grade campus is located in nearby Huntsburg, Ohio.

The city is also home to Lake Erie College, which is known for equine studies. The former Andrews Osborne Academy's Painesville campus became part of Lake Erie College in 2008.

Economy 

The largest employers are the city government, county government, and the public school systems.

Other notable employers include a number of high-tech manufacturing companies:

Avery Dennison– headquartered in Glendale, California, the company's Painesville facility specializes in label making, specialty paper, vinyl film casting, as well as other products.

Mar-Bal Corp. – specializes in thermoplastics manufacturing, injection molding, and finishing. Its headquarters and R&D department are located in Chagrin Falls; its Painesville facility employs about 200 people.  There are additional locations in China and there is a sales office in Shanghai. It was named on the Inc. magazine's fastest growing companies in 2013.

Lubrizol – a specialty chemical and petrochemical company wholly owned by Berkshire Hathaway since 2011. The Painesville plant employs 350 with an additional 1200 employees in nearby Wickliffe, Ohio (its corporate headquarters) and 4,700 nationwide. Among its product is the gelling agent used to make hand sanitizer.

AeroControlex – manufacturer of control valves, pumps and control assemblies for industries including aerospace, marine, and nuclear power generation. It is owned by TransDigm Group. The Painesville facility is the Aero Fluid Products division.

Guyer Precision – contract manufacturer of high-precision computer numerical control machined parts for automotive, aerospace, and other industries.

Eckart America – owned by German-based chemical company Altana, produces patented pigments for paints and coatings, graphic arts, pyrotechnical and other industries. The Painesville facility is Eckart's Ink Manufacturing and Graphic Arts Center.

Meritec – high‐performance electrical and electronic interconnect embedded systems and connectors for aerospace, defense, automotive, and medical device industries.

Ranpak's headquarters was in Painsville until it moved to nearby Concord, Ohio.

In popular culture 
The area in and around Painesville was used as the location for the filming of the 1964 feature film One Potato, Two Potato. The film, which was selected at that year's Cannes Film Festival, provides a glimpse of the era in the city's downtown, featuring its central park and surrounding architecture. The Lake County Courthouse and Painesville City Hall remain today. The Parmly Hotel, which is seen in the opening credits and occasionally throughout the film, has since been replaced by a shopping plaza and office complex.

Notable people 

 Josephine Penfield Cushman Bateham (1829-1901), social reformer, editor, writer
 Minerva Dayton Bateham, poet, hymnwriter
 Daniel Carter Beard, Boy Scouts of America co-founder
 John S. Casement, Civil War general
 Joe Dolce, singer-songwriter and poet
 Harlan Ellison, author
 Larry Foust, NBA player
 Emma Sheridan Fry, actor, playwright
 Shell Kepler, actor
 George Trumbull Ladd, psychologist
 Eschines P. Matthews, Wisconsin State Assemblyman
 Danny Nardico, boxer
 Tom Orosz, NFL player
 Byron Paine, Wisconsin Supreme Court justice
 Paul Ryczek, NFL player
 Jason Short, NFL player
 Don Shula, NFL player, coach
 Charles W. Stage, Ohio state representative, baseball umpire
 Pat Torpey, drummer

References

External links 

 
 Eastern Lake County Chamber of Commerce
 Downtown Painesville Organization

Cities in Lake County, Ohio
County seats in Ohio
Populated places established in 1800
Ohio populated places on Lake Erie
Cities in Ohio